Turaga Desiraju (1935–1992; Machilipatnam, Andhra Pradesh) was an Indian neurophysiologist and a professor at National Institute of Mental Health and Neurosciences (NIMHANS). He was associated with AIIMS Delhi before joining NIMHANS and founded the Department of Neurophysiology at NIMHANS in 1975. He was known for his neurophysiological studies on sleep and wakefulness and his extensive studies on the activities of cerebral cortex helped to widen the understanding of conscious behaviour.

Desiraju's studies on the neuron-physiology of Yoga and theories of consciousness were the corner stones of Project Consciousness, an experimental project promoted by NIMHANS which incorporated Yoga practices. He was the editor of Indian Journal of Physiology and Pharmacology and was an elected fellow of the National Academy of Medical Sciences. The Council of Scientific and Industrial Research, the apex agency of the Government of India for scientific research, awarded him the Shanti Swarup Bhatnagar Prize for Science and Technology, one of the highest Indian science awards for his contributions to Medical Sciences in 1980.

Selected bibliography

References

External links

Further reading 
 

Recipients of the Shanti Swarup Bhatnagar Award in Medical Science
Indian medical writers
Indian neuroscientists
Academic staff of the All India Institute of Medical Sciences, New Delhi
1935 births
1992 deaths
Medical doctors from Andhra Pradesh
Fellows of the National Academy of Medical Sciences
20th-century Indian medical doctors
People from Machilipatnam